Ksenija Pavlovic is an American journalist, political scientist, educator, political and cultural critic, a published poet and author of the novel Pisma Vetru.

Early life
Pavlovic was born in former Yugoslavia. After graduating in Journalism and Political Science from the University of Belgrade Faculty of Political Sciences and obtaining an M.A. in American politics, she moved to London to study at the London School of Economics (LSE) earning an MSc in European Ideas and Identities.

Career
Pavlovic has contributed to publications including The Spectator and Yale Herald and media on the Balkans including The Original, magazine founded by the Novak Djokovic Foundation. She serves on the foundation's editorial board as Managing Editor and is an advocate for early childhood education.

Pavlovic has interviewed figures including Arianna Huffington, Oscar-winning actress Marion Cotillard, filmmaker Abel Ferrara,  Anna Wintour, Sir Richard Branson, President of the World Bank Jim Yong Kim, Karlie Kloss, filmmaker and founder of the Webby awards Tiffany Shlain, film director Lars von Trier, actors Adam Brody, Monica Bellucci, Claudia Cardinale, fashion designers Adolfo Dominguez, Tommy Hilfiger and Donna Karan, publisher and former presidential candidate Steve Forbes; the tennis player Novak Djokovic; novelist Martin Amis, and Milorad Dodik, President of the Serbian entity of BIH.

Pavlovic has covered events such as the Cannes Film Festival, Venice Film Festival, Sarajevo Film Festival, Madrid Fashion Week, The Madrid Open as well as The Clinton Global Initiative.

She has served as a Teaching Fellow on both undergraduate and graduate levels at Yale University, as well as a Doctoral Fellow in the Political Science department at Yale University, Lead Instructor in International Affairs and Security and Politics, Law and Economics programs at Yale Young Global Scholars, Head Writing Fellow at the Yale Graduate Writing Center.

References

External links
 
 
 

American magazine editors
American women journalists
Living people
American people of Yugoslav descent
American people of Serbian descent
Women magazine editors
Year of birth missing (living people)
21st-century American women